Durbania is a genus of butterflies in the family Lycaenidae. The species of this genus are endemic to the Afrotropical realm.

Species
Durbania amakosa Trimen, 1862
Durbania limbata Trimen, 1887

External links
Durbania at Markku Savela's Lepidoptera and some other life forms

Poritiinae
Lycaenidae genera
Taxa named by Roland Trimen